For the state pageant affiliated with Miss Teen USA, see Miss Hawaii Teen USA

The Miss Hawaii's Teen competition is the pageant that selects the representative of the U.S. state of Hawaii in the Miss America's Teen pageant.

Kylee Amoroso Kawamoto of Kaneohe was crowned Miss Hawaii's Outstanding Teen on May 1st, 2022 at the Hawaii Convention Center in Honolulu, Hawaii. She competed for the title of Miss America's Outstanding Teen 2023 at the Hyatt Regency Dallas in Dallas, Texas on August 12, 2022 where she won the Top Dance Talent award.

In January of 2023, the official name of the pageant was changed from Miss Hawaii’s Outstanding Teen, to Miss Hawaii’s Teen, in accordance with the national pageant.

Results summary 
The year in parentheses indicates the year of Miss America's Outstanding Teen the award/placement was garnered.

Placements 

 Top 11: Ilima Sexton (2022)

Awards

Non-finalist awards 
 Non-finalist Talent: Maia Mayeshiro (2018)

Other awards 
 Miss Congeniality/Spirit of America: Lena Merrill (2011), Sophia Stark (2019)
 Outstanding Instrumental Talent: Maia Mayeshiro (2018)
 Top Dance Talent: Kylee Amoroso Kawamoto (2023)

Winners

References

External links
 Official website

Hawaii
Hawaii culture
Women in Hawaii
Annual events in Hawaii